Matheus de Barros da Silva (born 3 October 1997) is a Brazilian professional footballer who plays as a right back for Bulgarian First League club Lokomotiv Plovdiv.

Professional career
Silva made his professional debut with Bahia in a 0-0 Campeonato Brasileiro Série B tie with Fluminense de Feira on 20 January 2019. On 22 August 2020, Silva signed a professional contract with Moreirense.

References

External links
 
 

1997 births
Living people
Sportspeople from Pará
Brazilian footballers
Moreirense F.C. players
S.C. Farense players
Esporte Clube Bahia players
Paysandu Sport Club players
Primeira Liga players
Liga Portugal 2 players
Campeonato Brasileiro Série B players
Association football fullbacks
Brazilian expatriate sportspeople in Portugal
Expatriate footballers in Portugal
Brazilian expatriate footballers